The 1979 U.S. Women's Open was the 34th U.S. Women's Open, held July 12–15 at Brooklawn Country Club in Fairfield, Connecticut.

Jerilyn Britz won her first LPGA Tour event (and only major), two shots ahead of runners-up Debbie Massey and 

Co-leading after the first round and leading after the second, Britz shot a four-over-par 75 in the third round on Saturday. She entered the final round three strokes behind Massey and shot a two-under 69 for an even-par 284 total.

Past champions in the field

Source:

Final leaderboard
Sunday, July 15, 1979

Source:

References

External links
Golf Observer final leaderboard
U.S. Women's Open Golf Championship
Brooklawn Country Club

U.S. Women's Open
Golf in Connecticut
Sports competitions in Connecticut
Fairfield, Connecticut
Women's sports in Connecticut
U.S. Women's Open
U.S. Women's Open
U.S. Women's Open